The Best of Tim Buckley is a compilation LP by Tim Buckley. It presents Buckley as a folk artist with songs  written between 1966 and 1970. The album features material from the studio albums Tim Buckley, Goodbye and Hello, Happy Sad and Blue Afternoon, in addition to "Song to the Siren" from his avant garde album Starsailor. This was the first new release, outside of Australia after Buckley's death. The album provides an overview of Buckley's folk beginnings, excluding material from his later albums.

On October 2, 2006, the album was re-released, recompiled and remastered for a new retrospective. The new release featured a greater breadth of material from Buckley's career, including tracks from all of Buckley's studio albums. Reviews have been mixed, largely due to the problem of trying to give a retrospective of the artist while at the same time trying to include his most critically praised works.

Track listing
All songs by Tim Buckley unless noted otherwise:

Side one
"Aren't You The Girl"
"Song for Janie"
"I Can't See You" (Larry Beckett, Buckley)
"Carnival Song"
"Goodbye and Hello" (Beckett, Buckley)
"Dolphins" (Fred Neil)

Side two
"Happy Time"
"I Must Have Been Blind"
"The River"
"Strange Feelin'"
"Song to the Siren"

2006 re-release

"Aren't You the Girl" - 2:05
"Song for Janie" - 2:46
"I Can't See You" (Beckett, Buckley) - 2:42
"Carnival Song" - 3:12
"Morning Glory" (Beckett, Buckley) - 2:52
"Goodbye and Hello" (Beckett, Buckley) - 8:40
"Sing a Song for You" [Take 11] - 5:44
"Once I Was" - 3:24
"Strange Feelin'" - 7:38
"I Had a Talk With My Woman" - 5:59
"Happy Time" - 3:14
"I Must Have Been Blind" - 3:45
"The River" - 5:47
"Song to the Siren" - 3:28
"Dolphins" (Fred Neil) - 3:13
"Martha" (Tom Waits) - 3:18
"Move With Me" (Buckley, Jerry Goldstein) - 4:52
"Look at the Fool" - 5:10

References

Albums produced by Paul A. Rothchild
Rhino Records compilation albums
Tim Buckley compilation albums
1983 greatest hits albums